The Ministry of Culture is a Portuguese government ministry, responsible for issues related to the Portuguese culture. The current Minister of Culture is Pedro Adão e Silva.

References

External links
 Official site 

Portugal
Portuguese culture
Culture